Googlism  is a web application which queries text in Google, and displays the multiple ways in which the term is used among the results. The point is to type a word, and see what google "thinks" about that word. "It parses the results of a Google search, extracting oracular nuggets of wisdom like "dick cheney is not dead yet". As its home website describes: "Within the Google results are thousands of your thoughts and opinions about thousands of different topics, people, names, things and places, we simply search Google and let you know what website owners think about the name or topic you suggested."
Googlism was created by Paul Cherry and Chris Morton. The site has been featured in PCMag.com, About.com and ZDNet.com.

References

Australian websites